Karakol, also known as Karakol' and Qaraköl, (Qaraköl, قاراكول; , Karakol') is a town in Atyrau Region, western Kazakhstan.

References

Atyrau Region
Cities and towns in Kazakhstan